Isaac Azcuy (born 3 June 1953) is a Cuban former judoka who competed in the 1972 Summer Olympics and in the 1980 Summer Olympics.

References

1953 births
Living people
Olympic judoka of Cuba
Judoka at the 1972 Summer Olympics
Judoka at the 1980 Summer Olympics
Olympic silver medalists for Cuba
Olympic medalists in judo
Cuban male judoka
Medalists at the 1980 Summer Olympics
Pan American Games medalists in judo
Pan American Games gold medalists for Cuba
Judoka at the 1983 Pan American Games
Medalists at the 1983 Pan American Games
20th-century Cuban people
21st-century Cuban people